In the field of physics, engineering, and earth sciences, advection is the transport of a substance or quantity by bulk motion of a fluid. The properties of that substance are carried with it. Generally the majority of the advected substance is also a fluid. The properties that are carried with the advected substance are conserved properties such as energy. An example of advection is the transport of pollutants or silt in a river by bulk water flow downstream. Another commonly advected quantity is energy or enthalpy. Here the fluid may be any material that contains thermal energy, such as  water or air. In general, any substance or conserved, extensive quantity can be advected by a fluid that can hold or contain the quantity or substance.

During advection, a fluid transports some conserved quantity or material via bulk motion. The fluid's motion is described mathematically as a vector field, and the transported material is described by a scalar field showing its distribution over space. Advection requires currents in the fluid, and so cannot happen in rigid solids.  It does not include transport of substances by molecular diffusion.

Advection is sometimes confused with the more encompassing process of convection, which is the combination of advective transport and diffusive transport.

In meteorology and physical oceanography, advection often refers to the transport of some property of the atmosphere or ocean, such as heat, humidity (see moisture) or salinity.  

Advection is important for the formation of orographic clouds and the precipitation of water from clouds, as part of the hydrological cycle.

Distinction between advection and convection
The term advection often serves as a synonym for convection, and this correspondence of terms is used in the literature. More technically, convection applies to the movement of a fluid (often due to density gradients created by thermal gradients), whereas advection is the movement of some material by the velocity of the fluid. Thus, although it might seem confusing, it is technically correct to think of momentum being advected by the velocity field in the Navier-Stokes equations, although the resulting motion would be considered to be convection. Because of the specific use of the term convection to indicate transport in association with thermal gradients, it is probably safer to use the term advection if one is uncertain about which terminology best describes their particular system.

Meteorology
In meteorology and physical oceanography, advection often refers to the horizontal transport of some property of the atmosphere or ocean, such as heat, humidity or salinity, and convection generally refers to vertical transport (vertical advection). Advection is important for the formation of orographic clouds (terrain-forced convection) and the precipitation of water from clouds, as part of the hydrological cycle.

Other quantities 
The advection equation also applies if the quantity being advected is represented by a probability density function at each point, although accounting for diffusion is more difficult.

Mathematics of advection
The advection equation is the partial differential equation that governs the motion of a conserved scalar field as it is advected by a known velocity vector field.  It is derived using the scalar field's conservation law, together with Gauss's theorem, and taking the infinitesimal limit.

One easily  visualized example of advection is the transport of ink dumped into a river. As the river flows, ink will move downstream in a "pulse" via advection, as the water's movement itself transports the ink. If added to a lake without significant bulk water flow, the ink would simply disperse outwards from its source in a diffusive manner, which is not advection.  Note that as it moves downstream, the "pulse" of ink will also spread via diffusion.  The sum of these processes is called convection.

The advection equation

In Cartesian coordinates the advection operator is

The advection equation for a conserved quantity described by a scalar field  is expressed mathematically by a continuity equation:

where  is the divergence operator and again  is the velocity vector field. Frequently, it is assumed that the flow is incompressible, that is, the velocity field satisfies

In this case,  is said to be solenoidal. If this is so, the above equation can be rewritten as

In particular, if the flow is steady, then

which shows that  is constant along a streamline. 

If a vector quantity  (such as a magnetic field) is being advected by the solenoidal velocity field , the advection equation above becomes:

Here,  is a vector field instead of the scalar field .

Solving the equation

The advection equation is not simple to solve numerically: the system is a hyperbolic partial differential equation, and interest typically centers on discontinuous "shock" solutions (which are notoriously difficult for numerical schemes to handle).

Even with one space dimension and a constant velocity field, the system remains difficult to simulate.  The equation becomes

where  is the scalar field being advected 

Treatment of the advection operator in the incompressible Navier–Stokes equations

According to Zang, numerical simulation can be aided by considering the skew-symmetric form for the advection operator.

where

Since skew symmetry implies only imaginary eigenvalues, this form reduces the "blow up" and "spectral blocking" often experienced in numerical solutions with sharp discontinuities (see Boyd).

Using vector calculus identities, these operators can also be expressed in other ways, available in more software packages for more coordinate systems.

This form also makes visible that the skew-symmetric operator introduces error when the velocity field diverges. Solving the advection equation by numerical methods is very challenging and there is a large scientific literature about this.

See also 

 Atmosphere of Earth
 Conservation equation
 Courant–Friedrichs–Lewy condition
 Kinematic wave
 Overshoot (signal)
 Péclet number
 Radiation

References

Vector calculus
Atmospheric dynamics
Conservation equations
Equations of fluid dynamics
Oceanography
Convection
Heat transfer
Transport phenomena